Pam Greene (born February 15, 1954) is an American sprinter. She competed in the women's 200 metres at the 1972 Summer Olympics. Greene qualified for the 1980 U.S. Olympic team but was unable to compete due to the 1980 Summer Olympics boycott. Greene ran on the 4x100 relay at the 1973 World University Games, and was AIAW Champion in 1973 in the 200 metres. She also received one of 461 Congressional Gold Medals created especially for the spurned athletes.

References

External links
 

1954 births
Living people
Athletes (track and field) at the 1972 Summer Olympics
American female sprinters
Olympic track and field athletes of the United States
Track and field athletes from Denver
Congressional Gold Medal recipients
Olympic female sprinters
20th-century American women